Hemlock Fairground is a national historic district and fairground located at Hemlock in Livingston County, New York. There are two clusters of buildings near the racetrack. One cluster consists of the grandstand (constructed 1870) and livestock sheds located along the perimeter of the track at the southwest corner of the site. The second cluster consists of exhibition buildings located east of the track.

It was listed on the National Register of Historic Places in 2000.

References

External links
The Hemlock "Little World's" Fair - Hemlock, New York

Event venues on the National Register of Historic Places in New York (state)
Historic districts on the National Register of Historic Places in New York (state)
Historic districts in Livingston County, New York
Tourist attractions in Livingston County, New York
National Register of Historic Places in Livingston County, New York